Carignan is a commune in the Ardennes department in northern France. It is the seat of a canton. It was known as Yvoy or Yvois until 1662.

History
Carignan was, under the name Epoissium, Eposium, Epusum or Ivosium, a military settlement of the Romans. Gaugericus, bishop of Cambrai, was born in Eposium around 550. A little later it was the home of a stylite ascetic named Wulflaich.

As Yvois, it was part of the Duchy of Burgundy in the 15th century. It changed hands between the Habsburg Netherlands and France several times, until it was assigned to France by the 1659 Treaty of the Pyrenees. The town was given as a lordship to Prince Eugène-Maurice of Savoy-Carignan, and renamed Carignan in 1662.

Population

International relations

Carignan is twinned with:

 Weinsberg, Germany

See also
Communes of the Ardennes department

References

Communes of Ardennes (department)